"Jus 1 Kiss" is a song by English electronic dance music duo Basement Jaxx. It was released on 24 September 2001 by record label XL as the second single from their second studio album, Rooty (2001). It reached number 23 on the UK Singles Chart, number one on the UK Dance Chart, and was a minor hit in Australia and the Flanders region of Belgium.

Reception

Track listings

Charts

References

Songs about kissing
2001 singles
2001 songs
Basement Jaxx songs
Songs written by Bernard Edwards
Songs written by Felix Buxton
Songs written by Nile Rodgers
Songs written by Simon Ratcliffe (musician)
XL Recordings singles